Idleness is a lack of motion or energy. In describing a person, idle means the act of nothing or no work (for example: "John Smith is an idle person"). A person who spends his or her days doing nothing could be said to be "idly passing his or her days" (for example: "Mary has been idle on her instant messenger account for hours."). An idle machine is stopped, exerting no work. A computer processor or communication circuit is described as idle when it is not being used by any program, application or message. Similarly, an engine of an automobile may be described as idle when it is running only to sustain its running (not doing any useful work), this is also called the tickover (see idle).

Idleness as dependent upon cultural norms 
Typically, when one describes a machine as idle, it is an objective statement regarding its current state. However, when used to describe a person, idle typically carries a negative connotation, with the assumption that the person is wasting their time by doing nothing of value.

Such a view is reflected in the proverb "an idle mind is the devil's workshop". Also, the popular phrase "killing time" refers to idleness and can be defined as spending time doing nothing in particular in order that time seems to pass more quickly. These interpretations of idleness are not universal – they are more typically associated with Western cultures. Idleness was considered a disorderly offence in England punishable as a summary offense.

Involuntary enforced idleness is the punishment used for lazy or slacking workers in zero-hour contracts. Paid time off, which was introduced in the 20th century as a trade unionist reform, is now absent from an increasing number of job arrangements both as a money-saving mechanism and so that only work pays and thus reinforcing the stigma against idleness and enabling nature's punishment of idleness in the form of destitution and starvation.

Books on idleness 

The state of being idle is sometimes even celebrated with a few books on the subject of idleness. How to Be Idle by Tom Hodgkinson is one such example from an author who is also known for his magazine, "The Idler", devoted to promoting its ethos of "idle living". Bertrand Russell's In Praise of Idleness and Other Essays is another book that explores the virtues of being idle in the modern society.

Mark Slouka published an essay, "Quitting the Paint Factory: The Virtues of Idleness", hinting at a post-scarcity economy and linking conscious busyness with anti-democratic and fascist tendencies.

Brian O'Connor wrote a philosophical essay on Idleness. Most philosophers did ignore the subject or (Hegel, Marx) combat idleness.  Idleness is unworthy. Kant writes. The last chapter is Idleness as Freedom.

See also 

 In Praise of Idleness and Other Essays
 Inert
 Laziness
 Leisure
 Loitering
 Refusal of work
 Soldiering
 Slow movement (culture)
 The Idler
 The Importance of Being Idle (book)
 The Importance of Being Idle (song)
 Work (disambiguation)

References

Further reading

Human behavior